Castleguard Mountain, also known as Mount Castleguard, is an isolated mountain located near the southern edge of the Columbia Icefield at the northern edge of Banff National Park in Alberta, Canada. In 1918, Irish land surveyor Arthur Oliver Wheeler named the mountain because of its castle-like appearance, which seemed to stand guard over the southern portion of the Columbia Icefield.  Castleguard was first ascended in 1919 by the Interprovincial Boundary Commission, which determined the exact location of the boundary between British Columbia and Alberta along the continental divide.

Author Lewis Freeman, in his 1925 book Roof of the Rockies, described the view from the summit:

Geology

Castleguard is composed of sedimentary rock laid down during the Precambrian to Jurassic periods. Formed in shallow seas, this sedimentary rock was pushed east and over the top of younger rock during the Laramide orogeny.

Climate

Based on the Köppen climate classification, Castleguard is located in a subarctic climate with cold, snowy winters, and mild summers. Temperatures can drop below −20 °C with wind chill factors below −30 °C.

See also 

 Castleguard Cave, an extensively studied cave underneath the mountain

References

Further reading
 Robert W. Sandford, Ecology & Wonder in the Canadian Rocky Mountain Parks World Heritage Site, P 156
 E. J. Hart, Jimmy Simpson: Legend of the Rockies, PP 138, 142
 James Monroe Thorington, The Glittering Mountains of Canada: A Record of Exploration and Pioneer Ascents in the Canadian Rockies 1914-1924, PP 49–51
 Alan Carscallen, TSummer Ski-ing on the Columbia Icefields
 M. Ednie, M.N. Demuth, and B. Shepherd, Mass balance of the Athabasca and Saskatchewan sectors of the Columbia Icefield, Alberta for 2015 and 2016, GEOLOGICAL SURVEY OF CANADA OPEN FILE 8228, P. ii

External links
 

Three-thousanders of Alberta
Canadian Rockies